Kiss Me Sergeant is a 1930 British comedy film directed by Monty Banks and starring Leslie Fuller, Gladys Cruickshank and Gladys Frazin. It was based on a play by Syd Courtenay and was sometimes released under the alternative title Idol of Moolah.

It was shot at Elstree Studios as a quota quickie.

Plot summary
In India, a British soldier saves the jewelled eye of a sacred idol.

Cast
 Leslie Fuller as Bill Biggles
 Gladys Cruickshank as Kitty
 Gladys Frazin as Burahami
 Syd Courtenay as Lieutenant
 Mamie Holland as Fanny Adams
 Frank Melroyd as Colonel
 Lola Harvey as Colonel's Wife
 Roy Travers as Sergeant

References

Bibliography
 Chibnall, Steve. Quota Quickies: The Birth of the British 'B' Film. British Film Institute, 2007.
 Low, Rachael. Filmmaking in 1930s Britain. George Allen & Unwin, 1985.
 Wood, Linda. British Films, 1927-1939. British Film Institute, 1986.

External links

1930 films
Films shot at British International Pictures Studios
1930s English-language films
Films directed by Monty Banks
1930 comedy films
British comedy films
Quota quickies
British black-and-white films
1930s British films